The Old Library of St John's College, Cambridge connects to Third Court, and was built between 1623 and 1628, largely through the donations and efforts of two members of the College, Valentine Carey, Bishop of Exeter and John Williams, Lord-Keeper and Bishop of Lincoln.

History
When the College first opened in 1516, its Library was situated in what was then the College's only court, First Court. It occupied the first floor to the south of the Great Gate. Just over 100 years later, the Master of St John's received notification from Bishop Carey that Bishop John Williams, while not wishing to 'be counted the builder or founder' of a new library, was prepared to be a 'contributor towardes it'.

The building's shell was completed in 1624, a date which appears on the south gable of the western oriel window. The building is constructed in the Jacobean Gothic style, and measures 110 feet by 30 feet wide. The tall two-light windows are a very early example of Gothic Revival, but the façade is Renaissance-inspired. The library contains 42 bookcases arranged at right angles to the north and south walls, and is the home of the College's double-manual harpsichord.

Visiting
The Old Library is no longer used as a working library, but is open on weekdays until 5pm to both College members and their guests.

External links
 'The Old Library' on the St John's College website

St John's College, Cambridge
Libraries of the University of Cambridge
Buildings and structures completed in 1628
Library buildings completed in the 17th century
1628 establishments in England